Blue Pacific is a smooth vocal jazz album by American singer-songwriter and musician Michael Franks, released in 1990 with Reprise.

Background
The album marked three notable returns for Franks. The first was a return to the Reprise label since he'd released The Art of Tea in 1976. Tommy LiPuma also returned as producer of three tracks after a ten-year absence, the last album they worked on being One Bad Habit in 1980. Other three tracks on the album were produced by Walter Becker of Steely Dan and the remaining four by Jeff Lorber. 

Commentators noted the stylistic return to the more laid back, Brazilian jazz inspired music of his earlier works, as opposed to the more electronic pop sound Franks had experimented with throughout the 1980s.

Reception

Writing for AllMusic, Stephen J. Matteo praised Franks' "return to form and his best album since 1979's Tiger in the Rain ", commenting that "[t]he album marked a total rebirth for Franks." He described the album as "[m]editative, lush and clearly the work of an artist intent on making personal music regardless of trends or airplay, Blue Pacific is as open and beautiful as the ocean for which it is named."

Writing in the Orlando Sentinel in the year of the album's release, Susan M. Barbieri commented that "[w]hereas Franks' last effort, The Camera Never Lies, didn't quite click as an album, Blue Pacific does." She described the work as an "easy vocal [stroll] that [lulls] the listener into joining him in a state of calm" and praised the lyrics as "clever pop poetics for which this former English teacher is known."

Track listing

Personnel
 Michael Franks – vocals
 Marc Russo – alto saxophone (1, 7)
 Bob Sheppard, Kirk Whalum – tenor saxophone (5)
 Joe Sample – piano (4, 8)
 John Beasley – keyboards (3, 5, 10)
 Jeff Lorber – keyboards, programming, arrangements (1, 2, 6, 7)
 Larry Williams - synthesizer programming, synthesizer arrangements (4, 7, 8)
 Dean Parks – electric guitar (3, 5, 10)
 Buzz Feiten - guitar (2), acoustic guitar (3, 5, 10)
 Larry Carlton (4, 8), Paul Jackson Jr. (1, 6, 7), Michael Thompson (9) – guitar
 John Patitucci (9), Neil Stubenhaus (3, 5, 10), 'Ready' Freddie Washington (4, 8) – bass
 Vinnie Colaiuta (9), Peter Erskine (3, 5, 10), John Guerin (4, 8) – drums
 Sean Franks – cymbals (1, 2, 7)
 Alex Acuña (3, 5, 10), Luis Conte, Michael Fisher (3, 5, 10) – percussion (1, 2, 7-9)
 Brenda Russell (2, 7), Bunny Hull (2, 5, 7), Kareem (6), Livingston Taylor (10) – background vocals

References

Bibliography

Michael Franks (musician) albums
1990 albums
Reprise Records albums
Albums produced by Tommy LiPuma
Albums produced by Walter Becker